Gethin Benwil Hughes was third bishop of the Episcopal Diocese of San Diego. Hughes was ordained to the diaconate in 1967 by John Thomas (bishop of Swansea and Brecon) and to the priesthood by the same bishop in 1968. He served as Bishop of San Diego from 1992 to 2005.

See also 

List of bishops of the Episcopal Church in the United States of America

External links 
Leaving the flock: Retiring Espiscopal bishop doesn't want rewarding
San Diego's Episcopal Bishop Plans to Retire

Living people
Year of birth missing (living people)
Episcopal bishops of San Diego